The Gaspé station  is a closed Via Rail station in Gaspé, Quebec, Canada. It is located on Rue de la Marina.

It was the final stopover of Via Rail's Montreal–Gaspé train until service on the line (train 16/17 between Carleton and Gaspé) was interrupted in 2013. The station was staffed and is wheelchair-accessible. The station was only open on Monday, Thursday, and Saturday with Interac being accepted. Business hours were between 11:15 am and 3:15 pm. The station offered car rental services, a bicycle box, a baggage room, and an animal cage. Located within  from an airport, the station is located close to alternate methods of travel.

However, public transportation is unavailable to and from the train station. Private vehicles and taxi cabs are necessary to enter and exit the railway district.

, the closest regular service is provided at the Matapédia railway station. It is unknown if or when service to Gaspé will resume. The station building is used as an information center.

Nearest attractions
 Musée de la Gaspésie

External links

Via Rail stations in Quebec
Railway stations in Gaspésie–Îles-de-la-Madeleine
Transport in Gaspé, Quebec
Disused railway stations in Canada
Railway stations closed in 2013